In mathematics, the Tate curve is a curve defined over the ring of formal power series  with integer coefficients. Over the open subscheme where q is invertible, the Tate curve is an elliptic curve. The Tate curve can also be defined for q as an element of a complete field of norm less than 1, in which case the formal power series converge.

Definition

The Tate curve is the projective plane curve over the ring Z of formal power series with integer coefficients given (in an affine open subset of the projective plane) by the equation

where

are power series with integer coefficients.

The Tate curve over a complete field

Suppose that the field k is complete with respect to some absolute value | |, and q is a non-zero element of the field k with |q|<1. Then the series above all converge, and define an elliptic curve over k. If in addition q is non-zero then there is an isomorphism of groups from k*/qZ to this elliptic curve, taking w to (x(w),y(w)) for w not a power of q, where

and taking powers of q to the point at infinity of the elliptic curve. The series x(w) and y(w) are not formal power series in w.

Intuitive example 

In other words, we have an annulus, and we glue inner and outer edges.

But the annulus does not correspond to the circle minus a point: the annulus is the set of complex numbers between two consecutive powers of q; say all complex numbers with magnitude between 1 and q. That gives us two circles, i.e., the inner and outer edges of an annulus.

The image of the torus given here is a bunch of inlaid circles getting narrower and narrower as they approach the origin.

This is slightly different from the usual method beginning with a flat sheet of paper, and gluing together the sides to make a cylinder  , and then gluing together the edges of the cylinder to make a torus, .

This is slightly oversimplified. The Tate curve is really a curve over a formal power series ring rather than a curve over C. Intuitively, it is a family of curves depending on a formal parameter. When that formal parameter is zero it degenerates to a pinched torus, and when it is nonzero it is a torus).

Properties
The j-invariant of the Tate curve is given by a power series in q with leading term q−1.  Over a p-adic local field, therefore, j is non-integral and the Tate curve has semistable reduction of multiplicative type.  Conversely, every semistable elliptic curve over a local field is isomorphic to a Tate curve (up to quadratic twist).

References

Elliptic curves